You Can't Ration Love is a 1944 American comedy film directed by Lester Fuller and written by Val Burton and Hal Fimberg. The film stars Betty Jane Rhodes, Johnnie Johnston, Marjorie Weaver, Johnnie Davis, Marie Wilson and Bill Edwards. The film was released on February 28, 1944, by Paramount Pictures.

Plot

Cast 
Betty Jane Rhodes as Betty Hammond
Johnnie Johnston as John 'Two Point' Simpson 
Marjorie Weaver as Marian Douglas
Johnnie Davis as Kewpie 
Marie Wilson as Bubbles Keenan
Bill Edwards as Pete Allen
Roland Dupree as Pickles
Christine Forsythe as Christine
Alfonso D'Artega as Orchestra Leader

References

External links 
 

1944 films
American black-and-white films
1940s English-language films
Paramount Pictures films
American comedy films
1944 comedy films
1940s American films